Drudge is an American television series on Fox News Channel hosted by Matt Drudge that debuted June 1998. Drudge left the show in 1999 after network executives refused to let him show a picture of a 21-week-old unborn child.

References

External links

1990s American television talk shows
1998 American television series debuts
1999 American television series endings
English-language television shows
Fox News original programming